The 1st Soccer Bowl the first edition of the Soccer Bowl, and a post-season college soccer championship game between the Penn State Nittany Lions and the San Francisco Dons on January 1, 1950, at the Sportsman's Park in St. Louis, Missouri. The match ended in a 2–2 draw with Penn State and San Francisco sharing the title. The game was used to determine the champion of the 1949 ISFA season, which predated the NCAA as the premier organizing body of collegiate soccer, and represented the concluding game of the season for both teams.

Background 
Soccer had been played at the American collegiate level since at least the late 1860s, with variations of a kicking game being played since the mid-1840s. Organized collegiate soccer did not formally occur in the United States until the arrival of the Intercollegiate Soccer Football League, which began in 1904. The ISFL determined national championships for college programs from 1905 until 1925, and from 1926 until 1940 the Intercollegiate Soccer Football Association of America determined national champions. These championship titles were determined by a selection committee and were largely subjective. These championships are not formally recognized by the NCAA as legitimate national championship claims. 

Throughout World War II and into the late 1940s, the ISFAA did not claim any national championships, although several college programs with undefeated records, or teams atop the NSCAA poll claimed national championships during this time, causing numerous programs to stake championship claims in the same year. After World War II, the ISFA began declaring national championships, which drew ire from programs that felt they deserved a national championship title, but were not considered by the ISFA committee. 

The goal of the Soccer Bowl was to take the highest ranked NSCAA and ISFA teams to have them play a one off match at a neutral venue. The concept of a neutral venue and titling the match as a "bowl" was heavy inspired and barrowed from the bowl game system that college American football uses.

Route to the bowl

Penn State

San Francisco 
San Francisco ended the regular season with a perfect 10–0–0 record with a 6–0–0 record in the Northern California Intercollegiate Soccer Conference. In the championship game for the NCISC title, San Francisco defeated UCLA, 3–1, to win the title. Ahead of the Soccer Bowl, the Dons played an exhibition match against a semi-professional team known as the Los Angeles Aztecs (unrelated to the NASL Aztecs), and tied 2–2.

The San Francisco soccer teams of the mid 20th century were known for recruiting international talent, partially due to the city's cosmopolitan and international recognition. While the team was traveling from San Francisco to St. Louis, the team was going out to dinner at a local restaurant in the area. The waiter refused to serve San Francisco's Olifumni Osibogu, a black Nigerian player on the team. Head coach, Gus Donoghue, rounded up the team and the left the restaurant and went to a hotel and restaurant  in East St. Louis, Illinois, where integration was allowed.

The Match 
In the 1940s through 1950s, college soccer in the United States was played in four 22-minute quarters, partially in an effort to Americanize the sport to prevent alienating spectators. The match drew a crowd of 4,500 spectators at Sportsman's Park. The match was played in partly cloudy conditions, with unseasonably warm weather for winter.

The first goal of the match was scored by San Francisco's Dick Baptista. Penn State's Harry Little scored the tying goal off of a deflected shot. Baptista would score the go-ahead goal later in the match to give San Francisco the 2–1 lead. The match remained that scoreline until late into the fourth quarter. The center official allowed for six minutes of stoppage time, and with 10 seconds left in the match, the center referee, Harry Lyons, awarded a penalty kick to Penn State. Several San Francisco players protested saying that there was no handball to prompt the penalty kick. Penn State's Little would score the tying penalty kick ending the match in a 2–2 draw.

It has been disputed as to whether or not the match was agreed to end in a draw, or if San Francisco refused to play overtime against Penn State. Nevertheless, the 1st Soccer Bowl was declared to be a share title between Penn State and San Francisco, a national title both programs, the ISFA, as well as the American Soccer History Archives, recognize.

Details

See also 
 Soccer Bowl (1950–52)
 Intercollegiate Soccer Football Association
 Soccer in St. Louis

References

External links 
 Penn State Men's Soccer
 San Francisco Men's Soccer

Championship Game
1950
1950 in sports in Missouri
Penn State Nittany Lions men's soccer
San Francisco Dons men's soccer
January 1950 sports events in the United States
Soccer in St. Louis